Darío Ramos Morales (born 1 February 1993), is a Cuban professional football player who plays for Artemisa of Cuba, and the Cuba national team. He debuted internationally on 10 September 2019 in the CONCACAF Nations League in a 0–1 defeat against Canada.

Biography

Darío Ramos was born in Havana in 1993.

On 10 September 2019 he made his international debut against Canada in the CONCACAF Nations League, as he entered the pitch by a 72-minute change by Dariel Morejón. The game ended in a 0–1 loss.

On 11 October 2019, he played against the United States, and Ramos scored an own goal thanks to a rebound after a shot by American Jordan Morris. The game ended 7–0 defeat.

References

External links
 

1993 births
Living people
Cuban footballers
Cuba international footballers
Association football defenders
FC Isla de La Juventud players
FC Artemisa players
FC Las Tunas players
FC Ciego de Ávila players
Sportspeople from Havana
21st-century Cuban people